John William Barker (27 February 1906 – 20 January 1982) was an English footballer who played 327 league games for Derby County and won 11 England caps. He later managed Derby County and Bradford City.

Playing career

Derby County
Born in Denaby, near Conisbrough, England, Barker was a centre half who played youth football with Denaby Rovers in the Rawmarsh League while working full-time as a miner. His career nearly finished before it had barely started after he suffered a thigh injury at the pit following a roof collapse. He joined Midland League side Denaby United for one season, before he signed for Derby County for £200 in May 1928. He played in their great pre-war team under George Jobey when Derby were rarely outside the top six. Barker represented Derby in 327 league games but never won any silverware with the club.

England
However, his form earned Barker 11 caps for England. Barker won his first cap against Wales on 29 September 1934. His second game was the infamous Battle of Highbury in a hotly contested and violent match against Italy. Over the next two years he played nine more times both in friendlies and the British Home Championship. In his final game for England he was made captain against Wales on 17 October 1936.

Managerial career
After retiring from Derby County, Barker joined the Army Physical Training Corps before being appointed Bradford City manager in May 1946 taking charge of the team's first season following World War Two. He was steering City to a high position in Division Three (North) when he resigned in January 1947 after just eight months in charge. His reign was the shortest in City's history at the time.

He had a brief spell in charge of Irish club, Dundalk before he returned to Derby to work for Rolls-Royce. He moved to be trainer-coach at Oldham Athletic in 1948.

In November 1953, he returned to football management at Derby County to replace Stuart McMillan. The club had lost its international players and in 1954–55 the side were relegated to Division Three (North) for the first time in its history.

After football
Barker resigned to go back to work in Derby, as a fitter's mate at the Carriage and Wagon railway works in Derby.

Barker died in 1982 just before his 76th birthday following a fight against cancer and a spinal problem.

References

External links
England career profile

1906 births
1982 deaths
Military personnel from Yorkshire
People from Conisbrough
Footballers from Doncaster
English footballers
Association football defenders
Denaby United F.C. players
Derby County F.C. players
English Football League players
England international footballers
English football managers
Bradford City A.F.C. managers
Dundalk F.C. managers
Derby County F.C. managers
English Football League managers
English Football League representative players
British Army personnel of World War II
Royal Army Physical Training Corps soldiers